The 2017–18 Estonian Cup was the 28th season of the Estonian main domestic football knockout tournament. FCI Levadia won their ninth title after defeating Flora in the final.

The winner of the Cup were to qualify for the first qualifying round of the 2018–19 UEFA Europa League, but as FCI Levadia were already qualified the spot passed to Narva Trans.

First Round (1/64)
The draw was made by Estonian Football Association on 27 May 2017.
League level of the club in the brackets.
Rahvaliiga RL (people's league) is a league organized by Estonian Football Association, but not part of the main league system.

Byes
These teams were not drawn and secured a place in the second round without playing:
 Meistriliiga (Level 1):  JK Sillamäe Kalev, Tartu JK Tammeka, Pärnu JK Vaprus, Viljandi JK Tulevik 
 Esiliiga (2): FC Santos Tartu, JK Tallinna Kalev, FC Kuressaare, FC Elva 
 Esiliiga B (3): Viimsi JK
 II Liiga (4): Tallinna FC Levadia III, Tallinna JK Legion, Maardu United, Kohtla-Järve JK Järve II, Narva United FC
 III Liiga (5): Põhja-Tallinna JK Volta, JK Tallinna Kalev III, Rumori Calcio Tallinn, Suure-Jaani United, Koeru JK, Ambla Vallameeskond, JK Loo, Pärnu JK Poseidon, Tallinna FC Castovanni Eagles, FC Zenit Tallinn, Läänemaa JK, FC Lelle
 IV Liiga (6): Tallinna Depoo, Kohila Püsivus, FC Warrior Valga
 Rahvaliiga (RL): JK Rapla Lokomotiiv

Second round (1/32)
The draw for the second round was made on 28 June 2017.

Third round (1/16) 
The draw for the third round was made on 27 July 2017.

Fourth round  (1/8)
The draw for the fourth round was made on 17 August 2017.

Quarter-finals
The draw was made on 22 February 2018. At the end of the 2017 league season Levadia and FCI Tallinn merged. The second reserve team of FCI Tallinn, playing in the fourth league, inherited the club's name and cup entry.

Semi-finals
The draw was made on 19 April 2018.

Final
Final was played on 19 May 2018 at A. Le Coq Arena.

See also
 2017 Meistriliiga
 2018 Meistriliiga
 2017 Esiliiga
 2018 Esiliiga
 2017 Esiliiga B
 2018 Esiliiga B

References

External links
 Official website 

Estonian Cup seasons
Cup
Cup
Estonian